Nationality words link to articles with information on the nation's poetry or literature (for instance, Irish or France).

Events
 Baptista Mantuanus' Eclogues prescribed for use in St Paul's School (London).

Works published

Great Britain
 Anonymous, Cock Laurel's Boat, publication year uncertain; Cock Lorell led a gang of thieves in the early 16th century
 Alexander Barclay, Fifth Eclogue (see also Eclogues 1530, The Boke of Codrus and Mynalcas 1521
 Sir Thomas More, Epigrammata

Births
Death years link to the corresponding "[year] in poetry" article:
 Francesco Uberti (humanist) (born 1440), Italian, Latin-language poet

Deaths
Birth years link to the corresponding "[year] in poetry" article:
 Kabir, some dispute with his years of birth and death (born 1398 or 1440), mystic composer and saint of India, whose literature has greatly influenced the Bhakti movement of India

See also

 Poetry
 16th century in poetry
 16th century in literature
 French Renaissance literature
 Grands Rhétoriqueurs
 Renaissance literature
 Spanish Renaissance literature

Notes

16th-century poetry
Poetry